Thomas Fortescue may refer to:

Thomas Fortescue (Wallingford MP) (1534-1611), English MP for Wallingford (UK Parliament constituency)
Thomas Fortescue (1683–1769), Irish politician,  MP for Dundalk 1727–60
Thomas Fortescue, 1st Baron Clermont (1815–1887), Irish Whig politician
Thomas Fortescue (1744–1799),  MP for Trim in the Irish House of Commons 1768–99
Thomas Fortescue (secretary) (1784–1872), Anglo-Indian civilian and secretary